Emily Muriel Lucas also known as Meriel Lucas (1877-1962) was an English badminton player. Lucas from Devon was capped by England on only seven occasions between 1902-1909 but won a remarkable 17 All England titles.

Lucas played for the Teignmouth Badminton Club.

Her parents were Sir Alfred William Lucas and Dame Florence Emma Casswell. After marrying George Adams in 1911 Lucas retired from competition.

Medal Record at the All England Badminton Championships

References

English female badminton players
1877 births
1962 deaths